Oliver Twist (Hungarian: Twist Olivér) is a 1919 Hungarian silent drama film directed by Márton Garas and starring Tibor Lubinszky, Emil Fenyvessy and Jenő Törzs. It is an adaptation of the 1838 novel Oliver Twist by Charles Dickens.

Plot summary

Cast
 Tibor Lubinszky - Olivér 
 Emil Fenyvessy - Brownlow 
 Jenő Törzs - Monks 
 László Z. Molnár - Fagin 
 Sári Almási - Nancy 
 József Hajdú - Bumble 
 Marcsa Simon - Bumblené 
 Gyula Szőreghy - Sikes 
 Ernő Verebes - 1. tolvaj 
 Dezső Radány - 2. tolvaj 
 Margit von Banlaky - Róza

References

Bibliography
 Cunningham, John. Hungarian Cinema: From Coffee House to Multiplex. Wallflower Press, 2004.

External links
 

1919 films
Hungarian silent films
Hungarian drama films
1910s Hungarian-language films
Films directed by Márton Garas
Films based on Oliver Twist
Films set in England
Films set in London
Hungarian black-and-white films
1919 drama films
Silent drama films